Craterellus cornucopioides, or horn of plenty, is an edible mushroom. It is also known as the black chanterelle, black trumpet, trompette de la mort (French), trombetta dei morti (Italian) or trumpet of the dead, djondjon (Haitian).

The Cornucopia, in Greek mythology, referred to the magnificent horn of the nymph Amalthea's goat (or of herself in goat form), that filled itself with whatever meat or drink its owner requested. It has become the symbol of plenty.

A possible origin for the name "trumpet of the dead" is that the growing mushrooms were seen as being played as trumpets by dead people under the ground.

Description
The upper and inner surface is black or dark grey, and rarely yellow. The lower and outer fertile surface is a much lighter shade of grey. The fertile surface is more or less smooth but may be somewhat wrinkled.

The size of the elliptical spores is in the range 10–17 µm × 6–11 µm. The basidia are two-spored.

Distribution and habitat
This fungus is found in woods in Europe, North America, and East Asia. It mainly grows under beech, oak or other broad-leaved trees, especially in moss in moist spots on heavy calcareous soil.   In Europe it is generally common but seems to be rare in some countries such as the Netherlands. It appears from June to November, and in the UK, from August to November.

The mushroom is usually almost black, and it is hard to find because its dark colour easily blends in with the leaf litter on the forest floor. Hunters of this mushroom say it is like looking for black holes in the ground.

Related species

Craterellus cornucopioides has a smooth spore-bearing surface, but the rare, distantly related Cantharellus cinereus has rudimentary gills.  The colour and smooth undersurface make C. cornucopioides very distinctive.

The forms Craterellus fallax (with a different spore colour en masse) and Craterellus konradii (with a yellowish fruiting body) have been defined as separate species, but DNA studies now show that the latter should be considered part of C. cornucopioides

Edibility

Horns of plenty are edible and choice. According to a Portuguese study, 100 grams of dried C. cornucopioides contain 69.45 g of protein, 13.44 g of carbohydrates (mostly mannitol, a sugar alcohol) and 4.88 g of fat, amounting to 378 calories. They contain fatty acids, primarily of the polyunsaturated variety, as well as phenols, flavonoids and 87 mg of vitamin C. Along with Cantharellus cibarius (golden chanterelles) they are also a significant source of biologically active vitamin B12, containing 1.09-2.65 µg/100 g dry weight.

They look rather unattractive, but have a very good flavour. When dried their flavour acquires black truffle notes; in this form it can be crumbled as a condiment.

References

External links

 Mushroom-collecting.com: Craterellus cornucopioides
 MykoWeb California Fungi: Craterellus cornucopioides

Cantharellales
Edible fungi
Fungi of Europe